Octavius Eaden (15 December 1808, at Cambridge – 1832, at Cambridge) was an English cricketer who was associated with Cambridge Town Club and made his first-class debut in 1827.

References

Bibliography
 

1808 births
1832 deaths
English cricketers
English cricketers of 1826 to 1863
Cambridge Town Club cricketers